Deh Musa (also Romanized as Deh Mūsá, Deh Moosa, and Deh Mūsī; also known as Temūsa and Tīmūsi) is a village in Khezel-e Sharqi Rural District, Khezel District, Nahavand County, Hamadan Province, Iran. At the 2006 census, its population was 874, in 183 families.

References 

Populated places in Nahavand County